Bryan Andrés Ramos Paz (born 8 August 2001) is a Honduran professional footballer who plays as a goalkeeper for Real España.

References

Living people
2001 births
Honduran footballers
Association football goalkeepers
Liga Nacional de Fútbol Profesional de Honduras players
Real C.D. España players
Footballers at the 2020 Summer Olympics
Olympic footballers of Honduras